Akıncılar is a village in the Yeniçağa District of Bolu Province in Turkey. Its population is 193 (2021).

References

Villages in Yeniçağa District